A Commissioner of Official Languages is an official head of an office that is responsible for dealing with matters  regarding a country's policy towards its Official Languages. It is most commonly found in Commonwealth countries.

List of Commissioners of Official Languages by country
Office of the Commissioner of Official Languages, Canada
An Coimisinéir Teanga, Ireland
Dzongkha Development Commission, or Official Language Commission, Bhutan

See also
Language commissioner (disambiguation)

Government occupations
Language policy